Zelin Resiana (born 9 July 1972) is an Indonesian former badminton player who specialized in doubles. She trained at the Djarum club. For her achievements in badminton, a statue of her has been unveiled outside GOR Djarum in Tidar, Magelang, and inaugurated on 21 August 2015.

Career 
Resiana won the women's doubles at the U.S. (1996) and Indonesia (1996, 1997) Opens and at the Southeast Asian Games (1997) with Eliza Nathanael. They were runners-up at the All England Open in 1995 and 1997, and were bronze medalists at the 1997 IBF World Championships. Resiana and Nathanael were eliminated in the quarterfinals of the 1996 Olympic Games event in Atlanta, Georgia, United States by the eventual champions, China's Ge Fei and Gu Jun. In the mixed doubles, she won the 1993 Chinese Taipei Open with Denny Kantono. Resiana and Bambang Suprianto were eliminated in the quarterfinals of mixed doubles at the 2000 Summer Olympics in Sydney, Australia. Resiana was a member of the world champion Indonesian Uber Cup (women's international) teams in 1994 and 1996.

Personal life 
Resiana married former Indonesian men's singles badminton player, Joko Suprianto in 1999, and the two have twins on 24 March 2003.

Achievements

World Championships 
Women's doubles

World Cup 
Women's doubles

Asian Championships 
Women's doubles

Mixed doubles

Asian Cup 
Women's doubles

Southeast Asian Games 
Women's doubles

IBF World Grand Prix 
The World Badminton Grand Prix was sanctioned by the International Badminton Federation from 1983 to 2006.

Women's doubles

Mixed doubles

 IBF Grand Prix tournament
 IBF Grand Prix Finals tournament

References

External links 
 
 

1972 births
Living people
People from Magelang
Sportspeople from Central Java
Indonesian female badminton players
Badminton players at the 1996 Summer Olympics
Badminton players at the 2000 Summer Olympics
Olympic badminton players of Indonesia
Badminton players at the 1994 Asian Games
Asian Games silver medalists for Indonesia
Asian Games medalists in badminton
Medalists at the 1994 Asian Games
Competitors at the 1993 Southeast Asian Games
Competitors at the 1995 Southeast Asian Games
Competitors at the 1997 Southeast Asian Games
Southeast Asian Games gold medalists for Indonesia
Southeast Asian Games silver medalists for Indonesia
Southeast Asian Games medalists in badminton